Blue Party may refer to:
The Blue Party (Germany), national conservative party in Germany
Blue Party (Dominican Republic), a historical political party in the Dominican Republic
Parti bleu, a historical political party in pre-Confederation Canada
Semayawi Party, also known as the Blue party, a defunct political party in Ethiopia